Gudule is the main character of a series of French children's books published by Hachette-Jeunesse, authored by Fanny Joly and illustrated by Roser Capdevila. They were what inspired the Bravo Gudule (retitled Miss BG in English) television series.

Titles
Titles in the series include:
Bébé attaque Gudule
Bébé enleve es couches
Bébé et le Docteur Gudule published 1999
Docteur Gudule published 2007
Gudule a un bébé
Gudule baby-sitter
Gudule et les bébétes
Gudule garde bébé
Gudule la propreté
Gudule maîtress d'école
Gudule part en vacances
Joyeux Noël, Gudule ! published 2006
La cuisine de Gudule
La folle soirée de Gudule
La propreté selon Gudule
Le niversaire de Gudule published 2001
Un bébé pour Gudule
Une bébé ? Quelle drôle d'idée !

Only 2 do not have Gudule's name in the title.

See also
Saint Gudula

References

French children's books
Series of children's books